The Fleetwood family may refer to:
Fleetwood (noble family), a Swedish baronial family, originally from England
Fleetwood baronets, two baronetcies created for members of the Fleetwood family; one branch from Staffordshire and one from Lancashire, England